Ekaterina Alexandrova defeated Jeļena Ostapenko in the final, 7–6(7–4), 6–0 to win the women's singles tennis title at the 2022 Korea Open.

Zhu Lin was the defending champion from when the event was a WTA 125 tournament, but lost to Tatjana Maria in the quarterfinals.

Seeds

Draw

Finals

Top half

Bottom half

Qualifying

Seeds

Qualifiers

Lucky loser
  Victoria Jiménez Kasintseva

Qualifying draw

First qualifier

Second qualifier

Third qualifier

Fourth qualifier

Fifth qualifier

Sixth qualifier

References

External links 

Korea Open - Singles
2022 Singles